Copa Presidente may refer to the following association football tournaments:
 Copa El Salvador, a Salvadoran domestic cup tournament formally known as the Copa Presidente
 Copa Presidente de la Nación, a defunct Argentine domestic cup tournament
 Honduran Cup, a Honduran domestic cup tournament also known as the Copa Presidente